The River Ebble is one of the five rivers of the English city of Salisbury. Rising at Alvediston to the west of the city, it joins the River Avon at Bodenham, near Nunton.

Description

The River Chalke is the most significant tributary, rising in Bowerchalke and flowing through the Chalke Valley to join the Ebble at Mount Sorrel in Broad Chalke. The Chalke also provides a steady, year round flow, so that the winterbourne section of the Ebble is only from Alvediston to Knapp.

The flow of the Ebble is augmented at Little London by several pumped boreholes that feed the extensive commercial watercress farm at Knapp before the confluence with the Chalke.

Origin of the name
In the book Ebbesbourne Wake Through The Ages historian Peter Meers surmised that the land and the bourne (river) was once owned by a man called Ebbel.  He also identified that from Saxon times until 1166 there were two villages called Ebblesborne, one of which then became known as Bishopstone.  Note that the word "bourne" is derived from the Old English "brunna".

Further reading
 Howard Phipps, Ebble Valley (2007. Whittington Press) [limited edition, illus. by author]

References

Sources
 Wiltshire.gov.uk -  Chalk River Valleys

External links 

Geography of Salisbury
Ebble
2Ebble